Gorenja Vas may refer to several places in Slovenia: 

Current settlements
Gorenja Vas, Gorenja Vas–Poljane, a settlement in the Municipality of Gorenja Vas–Poljane, northwestern Slovenia
Gorenja Vas, Ivančna Gorica, a settlement in the Municipality of Ivančna Gorica, southeastern Slovenia
Gorenja Vas, Kanal ob Soči, a settlement in the Municipality of Kanal ob Soči, western Slovenia
Gorenja Vas, Ribnica, a former settlement in the Municipality of Ribnica, southern Slovenia
Gorenja Vas, Zagorje ob Savi, a settlement in the Municipality of Zagorje ob Savi, central Slovenia
Gorenja Vas pri Čatežu, a former settlement in the Municipality of Trebnje, southeastern Slovenia
Gorenja Vas pri Mirni, a settlement in the Municipality of Mirna, southeastern Slovenia
Gorenja Vas–Reteče, a settlement in the Municipality of Škofja Loka, northwestern Slovenia
Municipality of Gorenja Vas–Poljane, a municipality in northwestern Slovenia

Former settlements
Gorenja Vas pri Leskovcu, a former settlement in the Municipality of Krško, southeastern Slovenia
Gorenja Vas pri Mokronogu, a former settlement in the Municipality of Mokronog, southeastern Slovenia
Gorenja Vas pri Polici, a former settlement in the Municipality of Grosuplje, southeastern Slovenia
Gorenja Vas pri Šmarjeti, a former settlement in the Municipality of Šmarješke Toplice, southeastern Slovenia

In the past, it was also the name of
Cerknica, the town in southwestern Slovenia, the administrative centre of the Municipality of Cerknica, southwestern Slovenia
Gorenje, Kočevje, a settlement in the Municipality of Kočevje, southern Slovenia